The 1987 Lehigh Engineers football team was an American football team that represented Lehigh University during the 1987 NCAA Division I-AA football season. Lehigh finished second in the Colonial League.

In their second year under head coach Hank Small, the Engineers compiled a 5–5–1 record. 

The Engineers outscored opponents 221 to 201. Lehigh's 3–1–1 conference record placed second in the six-team Colonial League standings.

This was the 74th and final year that Lehigh played its home games at Taylor Stadium on the university's main campus in Bethlehem, Pennsylvania. The following year, Lehigh would open Goodman Stadium on the Goodman Campus; the former Taylor site is now occupied by Lehigh's business school and arts center.

Schedule

References

Lehigh
Lehigh Mountain Hawks football seasons
Lehigh Engineers football